Acta Societatis Botanicorum Poloniae is a quarterly peer-reviewed scientific journal published by the Polish Botanical Society. It covers all areas of botany. According to the Journal Citation Reports, the journal has a 2015 impact factor of 1.213.

The subsequent editors-in-chief have been: Dezydery Szymkiewicz (1922–1930), Kazimierz Bassalik (1930–1937), Kazimierz Piech (1938–1939), Dezydery Szymkiewicz and Kazimierz Bassalik (1945–1947), Kazimierz Bassalik (1948–1949), Kazimierz Bassalik and Wacław Gajewski (1949–1960), Wacław Gajewski and Henryk Teleżyński (1960–1977), Bohdan Rodkiewicz (1980–1990), Stefan Zajączkowski (1991–1992), Jerzy Fabiszewski (1993–2010), and Beata Zagórska-Marek (since 2011).

Since 2016, the journal is available exclusively as an online edition.

References

External links

 
 Polish Botanical Society
 Acta Societatis Botanicorum Poloniae at SCImago Journal Rank
 Acta Societatis Botanicorum Poloniae at HathiTrust Digital Library
 Acta Societatis Botanicorum Poloniae at Botanical Scientific Journals

Botany journals
English-language journals
Quarterly journals
Publications established in 1923
1923 establishments in Poland